Richard William Guenther (November 30, 1845April 5, 1913) was a German American immigrant, pharmacist, and Republican politician.  He served eight years in the United States House of Representatives, representing central Wisconsin, and was the 8th State Treasurer of Wisconsin.

Biography

Born in Potsdam, in the Province of Brandenburg, in what was then the Kingdom of Prussia.  Guenther received a college education and graduated from the Royal Pharmacy in Potsdam. He immigrated to the United States in 1866, settling in New York City, New York. He moved to Oshkosh, Wisconsin, in 1867 and engaged in the pharmaceutical business. He was Wisconsin State Treasurer from 1878 to 1882 and was elected a Republican to the United States House of Representatives in 1880, serving from 1881 to 1889. He first represented Wisconsin's 6th congressional district (March 4, 1881 - March 3, 1887), however redistricted and represented Wisconsin's 2nd congressional district for the 50th United States Congress (March 4, 1887 - March 3, 1889). He overall represented Wisconsin from the 47th to the 50th Congress.

Guenther was appointed consul general in Mexico City, Mexico by President Benjamin Harrison in 1890, serving until 1893, in Frankfurt, Germany by President William McKinley in 1898, serving until 1910, and to Cape Town, South Africa by President William Howard Taft in 1910, serving until his death in Oshkosh, Wisconsin on April 5, 1913. He was interred in Riverside Cemetery in Oshkosh.

The Richard Guenther House in Oshkosh is listed on the U.S. National Register of Historic Places.

References

External links

1845 births
1913 deaths
State treasurers of Wisconsin
American pharmacists
German pharmacists
German emigrants to the United States
Politicians from Oshkosh, Wisconsin
People from Potsdam
People from the Province of Brandenburg
Politicians from New York City
Republican Party members of the United States House of Representatives from Wisconsin
19th-century American politicians